Jan Riegel (born 3 August 1980) is a professional Czech football player who currently plays for SK Dynamo České Budějovice. As of 1 January 2012, Riegel has made 196 appearances in the Gambrinus liga. Riegel represented the Czech Republic at under-21 level, making three appearances between 2001 and 2002.

Career

Early career
Riegel started his career at Příbram, making his debut on 30 May 1999 in a Gambrinus liga match against FC Slovan Liberec.

He went on to make 10 appearances for Příbram in the 2000–01 season and 19 more the following season.

Riegel joined Drnovice on loan in April 2002. This time was marked by financial instability of Drnovice, which saw nine players sold to Příbram at the same time. At the end of the 2001–02 Gambrinus liga season, Drnovice were relegated and Riegel returned to Příbram.

After returning from Drnovice, Riegel established himself in Příbram's first team, making 98 further first team appearances and starting every game in the 2005–06 season.

Mladá Boleslav and Hradec Králové
On 26 July 2006, Riegel made his debut for Mladá Boleslav in the qualifying round of the 2006–07 UEFA Champions League against Vålerenga. He made his league debut on 5 August 2006 against 1. FC Slovácko. Riegel made his sixth and ultimately final league appearance for Mladá Boleslav on 1 October 2006.

In 2007, Riegel underwent knee surgery on two separate occasions. Riegel joined Czech 2. Liga side Hradec Králové in January 2008.

České Budějovice
In June 2008, Riegel signed a long-term contract with České Budějovice. In his first season with the club, Riegel scored three own goals, more than any other player in the 2008–09 Gambrinus liga.

In the 2010–11 season, Riegel made 10 appearances for Budějovice, before sustaining a knee injury in February 2011 in a winter training match against SK Slavia Prague. Riegel didn't play again that season.

In summer 2011, Riegel again underwent knee surgery, thus ruling him out of action for at least six more months.

References

External links
 Guardian Football
 Jan Riegel at the website of SK Dynamo České Budějovice

Czech footballers
1980 births
Living people
Czech First League players
1. FK Příbram players
FK Drnovice players
FK Mladá Boleslav players
FC Hradec Králové players
SK Dynamo České Budějovice players
Czech Republic under-21 international footballers
Association football defenders
Sportspeople from Příbram